Charlotte Plaza is a  tall skyscraper in Charlotte, North Carolina. It was built in 1982 and has 27 floors. It is the 20th-tallest building in the city. The Class A office building is owned by Rabina Properties, LLC. The ground and second floor are part of the Overstreet Mall, which connects to the neighboring BB&T Center via skybridge.

See also 
List of tallest buildings in Charlotte
List of tallest buildings in North Carolina

References 

 Emporis
 Official Site
 Charlotte Business Journal
 bnet article

External links

Skyscraper office buildings in Charlotte, North Carolina
Office buildings completed in 1982
1982 establishments in North Carolina